Kappl is a municipality in the district of Landeck in the Austrian state of Tyrol located about 17 km southwest of Landeck in the Paznaun Valley. It is one of the larger municipalities in the valley. Kappl was mentioned for the first time in 1370. The main source of income is tourism (especially skiing).

References

Cities and towns in Landeck District
Verwall Alps